Piney Orchard is an unincorporated community within the Washington DC suburb of Odenton, Maryland, United States. Piney Orchard began as a Planned Unit Development, and was a project of the Constellation Real Estate Group, Inc., a wholly owned subsidiary of the Constellation Energy Group, which itself, is now owned by Exelon.

Construction of the community began in 1991, although groundbreaking for what was to become the Nature Preserve started in 1987, when Constellation Real Estate Group began the effort to restore wetlands in an area which had been mined for sand and gravel in the 1940s and 1950s.  Several mitigation projects, the term used for this restoration, followed in five phases to replace wetlands filled in by the development of the community, and included the building and enhancement of five large ponds and the planting of shrubs, trees, and grasses native to the area. The Army Corps of Engineers, which oversees such efforts, monitored the progress of the mitigation sites until 1995, when it was determined the efforts had been successful. In 1996, the Piney Orchard Nature Preserve was officially opened.

More than 3500 housing units have been built in Piney Orchard and approximately 8500 residents live there. Constellation turned over the day-to-day supervision of Piney Orchard to the homeowners of the community in 2005. The Piney Orchard Community Association, or "POCA" as it is known, arranges several community-wide social activities and collects annual fees from all homeowners to maintain the aesthetic qualities of the community.

Piney Orchard Ice Arena, located at the corner of Piney Orchard Parkway and Riverscape Drive, had been the practice site for the Washington Capitals hockey team until 2006, when they moved to their newly built practice facility, Kettler Capitals Iceplex in Arlington, Virginia.

Sub-divisions within Piney Orchard

 Autumn Crest
 Brookwood
 Burgundy Place
 Cedar Ridge - Active Adult Community
 Chapel Village
 Chestnut Gable
 Chestnut Point
 The Courts
 Emory Woods
 Fieldstone Farms Apartments
 Francis Station
 The Gatherings at Forest Glen - Active Adult Community
 The Groves
 Harvest Run
 Maple Ridge
 Nature's Trail
 Piney Station
 River Colony
 River's Edge
 River Run
 Riverscape Apartments
 Settler's View
 Station House
 Stone Crossing
 Streamview
 Summer's Run
 Summit Chase
 The Vineyards
 Westcourts
 Woodland Walk

External links
Piney Orchard Community Association

Unincorporated communities in Anne Arundel County, Maryland
Unincorporated communities in Maryland
Exelon
Odenton, Maryland